Colombia participated in the 2010 Summer Youth Olympics in Singapore.

Medalists

Athletics

Boys
Track and Road Events

Girls
Track and Road Events

Boxing

Boys

Cycling

Cross Country

Time Trial

BMX

Road Race

Overall

 * Received −5 for finishing road race with all three racers, received −10 for finishing road race with two cyclists in the Top 16

Diving

Boys

Equestrian

Gymnastics

Artistic Gymnastics

Girls

Swimming

 * qualified due to a withdrawal of another swimmer

Taekwondo

Tennis

Singles

Doubles

Triathlon

Girls

Men's

Mixed

Weightlifting

Wrestling

Freestyle

Greco-Roman

References

External links
Competitors List: Colombia

2010 in Colombian sport
Nations at the 2010 Summer Youth Olympics
Colombia at the Youth Olympics